Radom longwave transmitter is a facility for commercial longwave transmission ( not broadcasting) west of Radom in Poland. Radom longwave transmitter, situated at 51°25'N and 21°07' E is the only transmission facility for frequencies under 100 kHz in Poland.
It uses an antenna system carried by 1 150 metre and 3 100 metre tall guyed masts.
Radom longwave transmitter worked ( and perhaps still works) on the following frequencies with the following callsigns:

 55.75 kHz, callsign: SOA60, 40 kW transmission power
 58.25 kHz, callsign: SOA70, 360 kW transmission power
 62.45 kHz, callsign: SOA80, 40 kW transmission power
 64.9 kHz,  callsign: SOA90, 40 kW transmission power
 76.35 kHz, callsign: SNA20, 40 kW transmission power
 80.5 kHz,  callsign:  SNA30, 40 kW transmission power
 81.35 kHz, callsign: SNA40, 40 kW transmission power

Today's use 
Today one of the masts is used for FM- and TV-broadcasting, under the name RON Radom.

Sources
 Gerd Klawitter, Lang- und Längstwelllenfunk, Siebel-Verlag, 
 Table of air traffic obstacles, Agencja Ruchu Lotniczego
 Aerial View
 Picture

External links
 http://radiopolska.pl/wykaz/pokaz_lokalizacja.php?pid=117
 http://emi.emitel.pl/EMITEL/obiekty.aspx?obiekt=DODR_E1O
 http://www.odkrywca-online.com/history-of-radom-wacyn-radio-station,624698.html#624698

Radio masts and towers in Poland
Longwave transmitter